This article presents the filmography of Lars von Trier.

Filmography

Short films

Notes 
 1^ These are the original titles that the films and miniseries were given.
 2^ The Elements of Crime, Epidemic and Europa are, respectively, the first, second and third part of the film trilogy Europa.
 3^ Breaking the Waves, The Idiots and Dancer in the Dark are, respectively, the first, second and third part of the film trilogy Golden Heart.
 4^ Dogville, Manderlay and the so-far-unmade Washington are, respectively, the first, second and third part of the film trilogy USA – Land of Opportunities.
 5^ Antichrist, Melancholia and Nymphomaniac are, respectively, the first, second and third part of the film trilogy Depression.
 6^ Riget, Riget II and Riget Exodus are, respectively, the first, second and third part of the miniseries trilogy Riget.

References

External links 

Trier, Lars von
Filmography